Dipterocarpus elongatus is a species of tree in the family Dipterocarpaceae found in Indonesia (Kalimantan and Sumatra), Malaysia (Peninsular Malaysia and Sarawak) and Singapore. This large tree occurs in secondary and primary forest, as well as in freshwater swamp forest.

References

elongatus
Trees of Borneo
Trees of Sumatra
Trees of Malaya
Critically endangered flora of Asia